In commutative algebra, the mathematical study of commutative rings, adic topologies are a family of topologies on the underlying set of a module, generalizing the -adic topologies on the integers.

Definition
Let  be a commutative ring and  an -module. Then each ideal  of  determines a topology on  called the -adic topology, characterized by the pseudometric   The family  is a basis for this topology.

Properties
With respect to the topology, the module operations of addition and multiplication are continuous, so that  becomes a topological module.  However,  need not be Hausdorff; it is Hausdorff if and only ifso that  becomes a genuine metric. Related to the usual terminology in topology, where a Hausdorff space is also called separated, in that case, the -adic topology is called separated.

The analogous result is not necessarily true for the submodule  itself: the subspace topology need not be the -adic topology. However, the two topologies coincide when  is Noetherian and  finitely generated. This follows from the Artin-Rees lemma.

Completion

It is also the same as (or canonically isomorphic to):  where the right-hand side is an inverse limit of quotient modules under natural projection.

For example, let  be a polynomial ring over a field  and  the (unique) homogeneous maximal ideal.

Closed submodules

There is a characterization:
In particular a Noetherian local ring is Zariski with respect to the maximal ideal.

References

Sources
 
 

Commutative algebra
Topology